Luca Dürholtz (born 18 August 1993) is a German professional footballer who plays as an attacking midfielder for  club SV Elversberg.

References

External links

Luca Dürholtz at Kicker

1993 births
Living people
People from Rheinisch-Bergischer Kreis
Sportspeople from Düsseldorf (region)
Footballers from North Rhine-Westphalia
German footballers
Germany youth international footballers
Bayer 04 Leverkusen II players
Dynamo Dresden players
Dynamo Dresden II players
Holstein Kiel players
SV Elversberg players
Rot-Weiss Essen players
2. Bundesliga players
3. Liga players
Regionalliga players
Association football midfielders